St. Patrick's High School ("St. Pat's") is an English language high school in Quebec City and a part of the Central Quebec School Board (CQSB).

History
St. Patrick's was established in 1843 on Rue Ste. Helene, on what is now McMahon Street opposite St. Patrick's Church. It was run by the Christian Brothers for boys grades one through six. In 1846 it joined Commission des écoles catholiques de Québec, a Roman Catholic school district. St. Patrick served as one of its Anglophone high schools, and by 1997 was its only one. It served the Irish Canadian population of Quebec City. In 1998 the religious school boards were dissolved and replaced with secular ones, so St. Patrick's became a part of the CQSB.

References

External links
 
 St. Patrick's High School 175th Anniversary

High schools in Quebec
Schools in Quebec City
Irish-Canadian culture
1843 establishments in Canada
Educational institutions established in 1843